An Exciting Evening at Home with Shadrach, Meshach and Abednego is an EP by rap trio the Beastie Boys. It was released on October 30, 1989.

The title refers to the Biblical story of Shadrach, Meshach, and Abednego and the fiery furnace in the Book of Daniel. However, the lyrics "Shadrach, Meshach, Abednego" in the title track are used and sampled from Sly Stone's "Loose Booty", where they are repeated and spoken rhythmically throughout the track in an almost rap-like form. The cover of the EP features a painting depicting Shadrach, Meshach, and Abednego in the Catacomb of Priscilla in Rome.

Track listing

References

1989 debut EPs
Beastie Boys EPs
Capitol Records EPs
Shadrach, Meshach, and Abednego
Albums produced by the Dust Brothers
EPs by American artists